The Santa Fe League is a high school athletic league that is part of the CIF Southern Section.

Member schools
 Bosco Tech (Rosemead)
 Mary Star of the Sea High School (San Pedro)
 St. Bernard High School (Playa del Rey)
 St. Genevieve High School (Panorama City)
 St. Mary's Academy (Inglewood)
 St. Monica Catholic High School (Santa Monica)
 St. Pius X - St. Matthias Academy (Downey)
 Verbum Dei High School (Watts)

References

CIF Southern Section leagues
Christian sports organizations